Caleb Samuel Shepard (born February 24, 1996), known professionally as Lil Gnar, is an American singer and rapper based in Atlanta.

Career 
Lil Gnar started gaining traction after he released the singles "Ride Wit Da Fye" with an accompanying video on Worldstarhiphop and "Death Note" featuring Lil Skies and Craig Xen with a video shot by Cole Bennett. Gnar released his debut collaboration EP titled "Big Bad Gnar Shit" on February 14, 2018, with rapper Germ, the EP had a sole guest appearance from Madeintyo and contained five songs. His debut Mixtape "GNAR Lif3" was released on September 28, 2018, which featured guest appearances from Lil Skies, Travis Barker, IDK and ZillaKami. Followed by his 2nd mixtape "FIRE HAZARD" released September 20, 2019, which featured guest appearances from YBN Nahmir, Thouxanbanfauni, Lil Yachty, Craig Xen, Lil Skies, Germ, UnoTheActivist, Robb Banks, Tyla Yaweh and Lil Tracy. Gnar released his second collaboration EP with Germ on February 21, 2020, titled "Big Bad Gnar Shit 2", the EP contained four songs with two released as singles. Gnar released his debut album "Die Bout It" on May 20, 2022, it features guest appearances from Tory Lanez, Yung Bans, the late Lil Keed, Yak Gotti, Trippie Redd, D. Savage, Lil Uzi Vert, Ski Mask the Slump God, Chief Keef and Lil Skies.

Personal life 
Lil Gnar was born in Oakland, California, but later moved to Atlanta, Georgia.

Discography

Studio albums

Mixtapes

Extended plays

Singles

As Lead Artist

As Featured Artist

Guest Appearances

References

Notes 

Rappers from Atlanta
People from Atlanta
African-American male rappers
American hip hop singers
21st-century American rappers
Pop rappers
21st-century American male musicians
21st-century African-American musicians
African-American songwriters
Living people
1996 births